On 21 April 2021, a car bombing killed at least five people and injured another twelve at the Serena Hotel, Quetta, Balochistan, Pakistan, near the Afghan border.

Bombing 
Ziaullah Lango, Balochistan provincial Home Minister said, that the blast took place in the parking lot of the hotel. Pakistan's Interior Minister Sheikh Rashid Ahmad announced that the primary target was believed to be China's ambassador to Pakistan, Nong Rong. Although the ambassador was staying at the luxury hotel, he was not there at the time of the bombing. Another possible reason given for the attack was that the bombing in the city of Quetta took place hours after Pakistan opened a new border crossing with neighboring Iran, a move that many have criticized. The Interior Minister confirmed that none of the hotel guests were injured, but a police officer and two security guards had been identified among the five victims.

Responsibility 
The Tehrik-i-Taliban Pakistan (TTP) claimed responsibility, saying it was a suicide attack.

See also
 August 2021 Quetta bombing

References

2021 in Balochistan, Pakistan
2021 murders in Pakistan
Serena Hotel bombing
21st-century mass murder in Pakistan
April 2021 crimes in Asia
April 2021 events in Pakistan
Attacks on hotels in Asia
Mass murder in 2021
Serena Hotel bombing
Suicide bombings in 2021
Serena Hotel
Suicide car and truck bombings in Pakistan
Tehrik-i-Taliban Pakistan attacks
Terrorist incidents in Pakistan in 2021